Oral Armstrong Lincoln Selkridge, RA, LEED AP (born 20 August 1962) is a former sprinter from Antigua and Barbuda. He competed in the men's 4 × 400 metres relay at the 1988 Summer Olympics. Selkridge now works as an architect in New York City.

References

External links
 

1962 births
Living people
Athletes (track and field) at the 1987 Pan American Games
Athletes (track and field) at the 1988 Summer Olympics
Antigua and Barbuda male sprinters
Antigua and Barbuda male hurdlers
Olympic athletes of Antigua and Barbuda
Pan American Games competitors for Antigua and Barbuda
Place of birth missing (living people)